Frederick Louis (27 October 1619 – 11 April 1681) was the Duke of Landsberg from 1645 until 1681, and the Count Palatine of Zweibrücken from 1661 until 1681.

Life
Frederick Louis was born in Heidelberg in 1619 as the only surviving son of Frederick Casimir, Count Palatine of Zweibrücken-Landsberg. After his father's death in 1645, Frederick Louis inherited his territories devastated by the Thirty Years' War. To a limited extent he contributed to the reconstruction efforts and he promoted trade to stabilise the situation. In 1661 he inherited the Duchy of Zweibrücken, another territory devastated by the war, following the death of Frederick, Count Palatine of Zweibrücken. He died at Landsberg Castle, near Obermoschel, in 1681. With the sons of his first marriage predeceased and the sons of his second morganatic marriage illegitimate, he was succeeded by King Charles XI of Sweden.

Marriage
Frederick Louis married his first cousin, Juliana Magdalena of Palatinate-Zweibrücken (23 April 1621 - 25 March 1672), daughter of Duke John II, on 14 November 1645 in Düsseldorf and had the following children:
 Charles Frederick (12 September 1646 - 22 October 1646)
 William Louis (23 February 1648 - 31 August 1675), married his first cousin Charlotte Frederica of Palatinate-Zweibrücken; they had two sons and a daughter who died in infancy.
 A daughter (28 December 1648 - 1 January 1649)
 A son (9 January 1650 - 12 January 1650)
 Gustavus John (11 January 1651 - 25 February 1652)
 A daughter (born and died 15 April 1652)
 Charlotte Amalie (24 May 1653 - 8 August 1707), married Count John Phillip of Isenburg-Offenbach 
 Louise Magdalena (17 June 1654 - 11 February 1672)
 Maria Sophie (13 August 1655 - 8 October 1659)
 Elizabeth Christine (27 October 1656 - 29 August 1707), married firstly Count Emich XIV of Leiningen-Dagsburg and secondly Christoph Frederick, Burgrave and Count of Dohna-Lauck 
 Charles Casimir (6 August 1658 - 14 September 1673)
 Juliana Eleanore (27 June 1661 - 12 February 1662)
 John (11 February 1662 - 25 January 1665)

Frederick Louis morganatically married Anna Marie Elisabeth Hepp (c. 1635 - 8 March 1722) on 21 August 1672 and had the following children:
 William Frederick of Fürstenwärther (12 October 1673 - 3 April 1732)
 Charles Aemilius of Fürstenwärther (28 November 1674 - 21 April 1758), married twice and leave descendants
 Louis Philip of Fürstenwärther (10 May 1676 - 26 February 1724)
 A son (born and died 10 May 1677)
 Maria Elizabeth of Fürstenwärther (2 January 1679 - 1680/1)

Ancestors

1619 births
1681 deaths 
Nobility from Heidelberg
House of Wittelsbach
Counts Palatine of Zweibrücken